Phibalapteryx is a genus of butterflies belonging to the family Geometridae.

Species:
 Phibalapteryx virgata (Hufnagel, 1767)

References

Geometridae
Geometridae genera